Brancaccio is an Italian surname. Notable people with the surname include:

 Antonio Brancaccio
 David Brancaccio
 Francesco Maria Brancaccio (d. 1675), Cardinal
 Giulio Cesare Brancaccio
 Landolfo Brancaccio (d. 1311), Cardinal
 Luigi Brancaccio (d. 1411), Cardinal
 Niccolò Brancaccio (d. 1412), Cardinal
 Rinaldo Brancaccio (d. 1427), Cardinal
 Stefano Brancaccio (d. 1682), Cardinal
 Tommaso Brancaccio (cardinal) (d. 1427), Bishop of Pozzuoli, then of Tricarico; Cardinal from 1411
 Tommaso Brancaccio (1621–1677), Bishop of Nardo, and former bishop of Avellino

Notes

Italian-language surnames